Jiangsu siyang middle school was founded in 1927 in Jiangsu province, China, developing a long history. In 1991, Siyang middle school went through the provincial key middle school review. In January 1999, it was approved by the provincial education commission and renamed "the jiangsu province siyang middle school". In the same year in July, Nanjing Normal University education signed a joint and Siyang middle school became Nanjing Normal University's experimental middle school. In April 2001, a national demonstration went through high school accreditation. In 2004, the provincial department of education selected it as a four-star school.

Location 
The school is located in the political and cultural center of town.

School size 

Awards 
Awards include "Jiangsu model school","Advanced group of jiangsu province" and "Suqian May 1 Labour Medal"

References

Middle schools in Jiangsu